Broken English is a 1981 drama film based on the theme of interracial romance. It is the only film to feature Oona O'Neill in an acting role.

Plot
Partly subtitled, the film follows the story of Sarah, who comes under fire from her family, friends and colleagues when she marries an African man, Maas. When she discovers that Maas is part of an underground group of South African freedom fighters, she must analyze her own political and sexual beliefs.

Cast

Beverly Ross as Sarah
Jacques Martial as Maas
Greta Ronningen as Leslie
Mansour Sy as Cheekh
Oona O'Neill as Sarah's Mother
Frankie Stein as Cecile
Sandy Whitelaw as Arms Dealer
Hassane Fall as Amidau
Valérie Kling as Agency Woman
Michel Nicolini as Merchant
Serge Rynecki as Jacques
Réginald Huguenin as Pat
Makhete Diallo as Makhete

Production
Broken English was the directorial debut of Michie Gleason, who at the time was romantically involved with Terrence Malick. It was produced by Bert Schneider, whom Gleason had conflicts with; he insisted that his wife Greta Ronningen be cast in the film and pressured her to add more sex scenes.

Lorimar, the production company, refused to distribute the completed film because it was not sexually explicit enough. Schneider filed a successful lawsuit against them, but it would be his last picture as a producer. The film has never been shown or released outside of festival screenings.

References

External links

1981 films
1981 romantic drama films
American romantic drama films
1980s English-language films
Films about interracial romance
Films scored by Georges Delerue
1980s American films